The Williams Lake Stampeders are an intermediate and senior hockey ice hockey team in Williams Lake, British Columbia.

Background
The senior team played in the Cariboo Hockey League from the league's founding in 1936 until 1979. The Stampeders won the league title twice, in 1960-61 and 1962-63.

The team was revived in 1996 after the Junior "A" Williams Lake Mustangs. It has mostly played in the Central Interior Hockey League since then. In 2009, the Stampeders won the Coy Cup, the senior championship of British Columbia. In 2010 the Stampeders won their first Central Interior Hockey League Championship with a two-game sweep of the Kitimat Ice Demons. The team would then go on to a third-place finish in the Coy Cup, which was hosted in Powell River, British Columbia.

Dylan Richardson took over as President and even though he is an avid Leaf fan, the team still plans on winning in the playoffs.

The Stampeders won back-to-back Coy Cup championships in 2013 and 2014, hosted in Kitimat and Williams Lake, respectively.

References

External links
http://www.wlstampeders.com

Ice hockey teams in British Columbia
Ice hockey clubs established in 1996
1996 establishments in British Columbia